Rapa rapa, common name the bubble turnip, is a species of sea snail, a marine gastropod mollusk in the family Muricidae, the murex snails or rock snails.

Description
Rapa rapa was first described in 1758 by Carl Linnaeus as Murex rapa. Its shell size can range from 40 to 105 mm.

Distribution
Rapa rapa is found near the Indian Ocean in locations such as Madagascar, the Chagos Archipelago, and the coasts of Tanzania, where it was described in 1856 by Xavier Montrouzier as Rapa penardi. It is also found in the east on the coasts of China and the Philippines.

References

 Lamarck J.B. (1816). Liste des objets représentés dans les planches de cette livraison. In: Tableau encyclopédique et méthodique des trois règnes de la Nature. Mollusques et Polypes divers. Agasse, Paris. 16 pp.
 Nevill, G.; Nevill, H. (1869). Descriptions of marine Gastropoda from Ceylon, etc. Journal of the Asiatic Society of Bengal. 38(2): 157-164, pl. 17
 Bozzetti L. (2008) Rapana pellucida (Gastropoda: Hypsogastropoda: Muricidae: Rapaninae) nuove specie dal Madagascar Meridionale. Malacologia Mostra Mondiale 58: 5-6.
 Oliverio, M. (2008). Coralliophilinae (Neogastropoda: Muricidae) from the southwest Pacific. in: Héros, V. et al. (Ed.) Tropical Deep-Sea Benthos 25. Mémoires du Muséum national d'Histoire naturelle (1993). 196: 481-585. 
 Steyn, D.G & Lussi, M. (2005). Offshore Shells of Southern Africa: A pictorial guide to more than 750 Gastropods. Published by the authors. Pp. i–vi, 1–289.
 Kilburn R.N., Marais J.P. & Marais A.P. (2010) Coralliophilinae. pp. 272–292, in: Marais A.P. & Seccombe A.D. (eds), Identification guide to the seashells of South Africa. Volume 1. Groenkloof: Centre for Molluscan Studies. 376 pp.
 Liu, J.Y. [Ruiyu] (ed.). (2008). Checklist of marine biota of China seas. China Science Press. 1267 pp.

External links
 Röding, P.F. (1798). Museum Boltenianum sive Catalogus cimeliorum e tribus regnis naturæ quæ olim collegerat Joa. Fried Bolten, M. D. p. d. per XL. annos proto physicus Hamburgensis. Pars secunda continens Conchylia sive Testacea univalvia, bivalvia & multivalvia. Trapp, Hamburg. viii, 199 pp.
 Nevill, G.; Nevill, H. (1869). Descriptions of marine Gastropoda from Ceylon, etc. Journal of the Asiatic Society of Bengal. 38(2): 157-164, pl. 17
 Kilburn, R.N. (1977) Taxonomic studies on the marine Mollusca of southern Africa and Mozambique. Part 1. Annals of the Natal Museum, 23, 173–214
' 'Rapa rapa'' at WoRMS

Rapa (gastropod)
Gastropods described in 1758
Taxa named by Carl Linnaeus